The 1986–87 Georgia Southern Eagles men's basketball team represented Georgia Southern University during the 1986–87 NCAA Division I men's basketball season. The Eagles, led by fifth year head coach Frank Kerns, played their home games at Hanner Fieldhouse in Statesboro, Georgia as members of the Trans America Athletic Conference. The team finished fourth in the regular season conference standings and won the TAAC tournament to earn an automatic bid to the NCAA tournament. As No. 15 seed in the East region, the Eagles lost in the opening round to No. 2 seed and eventual National runner-up Syracuse, 79–73, to finish with a 20–11 record (12–6 TAAC).

Roster

Schedule and results

|-
!colspan=12 style=| Regular season

|-
!colspan=12 style=| TAAC tournament

|-
!colspan=12 style=| NCAA tournament

Source

References

Georgia Southern Eagles men's basketball seasons
Georgia Southern
Georgia Southern
Georgia Southern Eagles men's basketball
Georgia Southern Eagles men's basketball